The Queens County Farm Museum, also known as Queens Farm, is a historic farm located on  of the neighborhoods of Floral Park and Glen Oaks in Queens, New York City. The farm occupies the city's largest remaining tract of undisturbed farmland (in operation since 1697), and is still a working farm today. The site features restored farm buildings from three different centuries, a greenhouse, planting fields, livestock, and various examples of vintage farm equipment. Queens Farm practices sustainable agriculture and has a four-season growing program.

The museum includes the Adriance Farmhouse, a New York City Landmark on the National Register of Historic Places. Free guided tours of the farmhouse are offered to the public Saturdays and Sundays year-round. Hayrides are offered on weekends from April through October. An on-site seasonal farmstand featuring Queens Farm vegetables, herbs, and flowers takes place every Wednesday through Sunday from May through October.

Cornell Farmhouse

The Cornell Farmhouse was built in 1750 with Dutch and English architectural features.  The Farmhouse is also known as the Creedmoor Farmhouse Complex or the Adriance Farmhouse. It is part of the museum and is owned and operated by the New York City Department of Parks and Recreation (NYC Parks).

It was listed as a New York City Landmark in 1976, and on the National Register of Historic Places in 1979.

History

The farm was privately owned by a Dutch family, the Adriances, from 1697 to 1808. Their three-room farmhouse, built in 1772, has been restored and still stands. After 1808, a series of families owned the farm as it continued to evolve from a colonial homestead to a modern "truck farming" or market gardening business. Under its last private farmer, Daniel Stattel,  it became, by 1900, "the second largest [farm] in size in Queens County and the highest in dollar value...assessed at 32,000 dollars." In 1926, the Stattels sold the farm to real estate investor Pauline Reisman, who, in turn, later that year sold it to Creedmoor State Hospital, which used it for occupational therapy, to stock its kitchen, and to grow ornamental plants for the rest of the hospital campus. In 1975, state legislation authored by Frank Padavan transferred ownership of the farm from the hospital to NYC Parks for the purpose of starting a museum.

See also
 List of museums and cultural institutions in New York City
 Open-air museum
 List of New York City Designated Landmarks in Queens
 National Register of Historic Places listings in Queens

References

External links

 

Farm museums in New York (state)
Glen Oaks, Queens
Greek Revival architecture in New York City
Greek Revival houses in New York (state)
Historic house museums in New York City
Houses completed in 1750
Houses on the National Register of Historic Places in Queens, New York
Museums in Queens, New York
New York City Designated Landmarks in Queens, New York
Parks in Queens, New York
Farms in New York City